Beta Ursae Majoris (β Ursae Majoris, abbreviated Beta UMa, β UMa), formally named Merak , is a star in the northern constellation of Ursa Major.

The apparent visual magnitude of this star is +2.37, which means it is readily visible to the naked eye. It is more familiar to northern hemisphere observers as one of the "pointer stars" in the Big Dipper, or the Plough (UK), which is a prominent asterism of seven stars that forms part of the larger constellation. Extending an imaginary straight line from this star through the nearby Alpha Ursae Majoris (Dubhe) extends to Polaris, the north star.

Spectral classification
In 1943, β Ursae Majoris was listed as a spectral standard for the class of A1 V. When improved instruments made it possible to identify subgiant luminosity classes for early A-class stars, β Ursae Majoris was assigned that class A0 IV. This was later revised to A1 IV. It is considered to be a mild Am star, a type of chemically peculiar star with unusually strong lines of certain metallic elements.

Properties
It is a subgiant, a star that has exhausted the hydrogen in its core and is now cooling as it generates energy through the thermonuclear fusion of hydrogen in a shell outside the core. The effective temperature of the outer envelope is about 9,225 K, giving it a white-hued glow that is typical for A-type stars. It is larger than the Sun, with about 2.7 times the mass and 2.84 times the solar radius. If they were viewed from the same distance, Beta Ursae Majoris would appear much brighter than the Sun, as it is radiating 68 times the Sun's luminosity.

Observation of the star in the infrared reveal an excess emission that suggests the presence of a circumstellar debris disk of orbiting dust, much like those discovered around Fomalhaut and Vega. The mean temperature of this disk is 120 K, indicating that it is centered at a radius of 47 AU from the host star. The dust has an estimated mass of about 0.27% the mass of the Earth.

Beta Ursae Majoris is one of five stars in the Big Dipper that form a part of a loose open cluster called the Ursa Major moving group, sharing the same region of space and not just the same patch of sky from Earth's perspective. This group has an estimated age of about 500 (± 100) million years. As the members of this group share a common origin and motion through space, this yields an estimate for the age of Beta Ursae Majoris.

Nomenclature
β Ursae Majoris (Latinised to Beta Ursae Majoris) is the star's Bayer designation.

It bore the traditional name Merak derived from the Arabic المراق al-maraqq 'the loins' (of the bear). In 2016, the International Astronomical Union organized a Working Group on Star Names (WGSN) to catalog and standardize proper names for stars. The WGSN's first bulletin of July 2016 included a table of the first two batches of names approved by the WGSN; which included Merak for this star.

The Hindus called the star Pulaha, one of the Seven Rishis.

In culture
USS Merak (1918) and USS Merak (AF-21) are both United States navy ships.

See also
 Lists of stars
 List of brightest stars
 List of nearest bright stars
 Historical brightest stars

References

A-type subgiants
Suspected variables
Ursa Major Moving Group

Merak
Ursae Majoris, Beta
Ursa Major (constellation)
Big Dipper
BD+57 1302
Ursae Majoris, 48
095418
053910
4295
Am stars